Craig-y-nos railway station was a station in Penwyllt, Powys, Wales. The station was opened in 1867 and closed in 1962. The station building, built in 1886, was funded by Adelina Patti.

References

Further reading

Disused railway stations in Powys
Railway stations in Great Britain opened in 1867
Railway stations in Great Britain closed in 1962
Former Great Western Railway stations